The 2020 NCAA Division I women's basketball tournament was scheduled to be played in March and April 2020, with the Final Four played Friday, April 3 and Sunday, April 5 to determine the champion of the 2019–20 NCAA Division I women's basketball season.  The Final Four was planned to be played at the Smoothie King Center in New Orleans, Louisiana, with the University of New Orleans, Tulane University and the Sun Belt Conference serving as hosts. This is the fourth time that New Orleans has been selected as a women's Final Four location (previously, in 1991, 2004, and 2013) and third time at the Smoothie King Center (previously named New Orleans Arena); the 1991 Final Four was contested at the University of New Orleans' Lakefront Arena. ESPN had planned to nationally televise all  63 games of the women's tournament for the first time ever.

However, on March 12, the NCAA announced that this tournament was canceled due to the COVID-19 pandemic. It was the first time the tournament had been canceled since its creation in 1982.

Tournament procedure

	
Pending any changes to the format, a total of 64 teams will enter the 2020 tournament. 32 automatic bids shall be awarded to each program that wins their conference's tournament. The remaining 32 bids are "at-large", with selections extended by the NCAA Selection Committee. The tournament is split into four regional tournaments, and each regional has teams seeded from 1 to 16, with the committee ostensibly making every region as comparable to the others as possible. The top-seeded team in each region plays the #16 team, the #2 team plays the #15, etc. (meaning where the two seeds add up to 17, that team will be assigned to play another).

The selection committee will also seed the entire field from 1 to 64.

2020 NCAA tournament schedule and venues 

The first two rounds, also referred to as the subregionals, were to be played at the sites of the top 16 seeds, as was done from 1995 to 2004 and since 2016.

Regional semifinals and finals (Sweet Sixteen and Elite Eight)
 March 27–30
Dallas regional, Moody Coliseum, Dallas, Texas (Host: SMU)
 Fort Wayne regional, Allen County War Memorial Coliseum, Fort Wayne, Indiana (Host: Purdue Fort Wayne)
 Greenville regional, Bon Secours Wellness Arena, Greenville, South Carolina (Host: Southern Conference)
 Portland regional, Moda Center, Portland, Oregon (Host: Oregon State)
National semifinals and championship (Final Four and championship)
 April 3 and April 5
 Smoothie King Center, New Orleans, Louisiana (Hosts: University of New Orleans, Tulane University, and Sun Belt Conference)

Coronavirus impact
On March 11, 2020, the NCAA announced that both men's and women's NCAA Tournaments would take place without fans due to the COVID-19 pandemic in the United States. This was followed up, on March 12, by an announcement cancelling the tournaments.

Subregionals tournament and automatic qualifiers

Automatic qualifiers
The following teams had automatically qualified for the 2020 NCAA field by virtue of winning their conference's tournament. All conference tournaments that had not been completed were cancelled, the majority of which without naming an automatic qualifier.
Teams marked with † received automatic bids after their conference tournaments were cancelled due to the coronavirus pandemic.

Notes

See also 
 2020 NCAA Division I men's basketball tournament

References 

NCAA tournament
NCAA Division I women's basketball tournament
NCAA Division I women's basketball tournament
2020 in Louisiana
NCAA Division I Women's